is a Japanese actor. Regarded as a child prodigy across 25 years in the industry, he has garnered many awards for his performances.

Personal life 

After he was born, he was in the intensive care unit for four months and remained in critical condition for two months. As an infant, he lost weight rapidly due to a gastrointestinal disease of unknown cause, and it was dangerous enough that the doctor said the survival rate was 1%. According to the doctor, even if he survived, he would still be disabled. He was finally discharged from the hospital when he was seven months old. His mother came up with the idea of making him a child actor to leave concrete proof of his existence. His family consists of his grandparents, father, mother, a sister who is 11 years older than him and two nieces. His grandmother died in 2020.

Career 

Kamiki began acting as a child actor after entering the Central Group talent agency. His first commercial was for a Toy Box when he was only two years old. He made his television debut with the 1999 drama Good News in a lead role. In 2001, when he was five years old, he was personally scouted by Hayao Miyazaki. Kamiki went on to voice characters in many of Studio Ghibli's feature films, giving him the title of the Ghibli Child. In 2004 he lead the film Backdrop del mio Papa, for which he won his first award. In the following years, he continued to work both as an actor and voice actor, winning awards every two years. Known as the 100 Billion Yen Man, Kamiki has appeared in the top seven of the top ten highest-grossing Japanese films in Japan of all time. Kamiki won the Rookie Award 2020 at the Elan d'or Awards, one of the most prestigious awards in Japan.

On March 16, 2021, Kamiki left Amuse to join Co-LaVo.

Other Ventures 

Kamiki wrote his first book "Master's Cafe: The Fulfillment of Masters' Dreams" in 2015. He approached fifteen professionals who are active on the front lines of various fields. In 2019, he made his stage debut with the play "Beautiful: The Woman Who Met with God", written and directed by Suzuki Matsuo. The following year, he debuted in multiple fields such as a radio host for All Night Nippon 0 (ANN0), direction with the music video for "I Treasure You", and he opened his official YouTube channel. He was also the official photographer for Satoh Takeru's 2021 calendar. In 2020, he started to conceptualize his annual calendar.

The 2021 calendar, one part of the 25th anniversary project, was started when "Novel characters I want Kamiki to play" video was posted on his Twitter, urging fans to suggest novel characters for him to portray. Garnering reactions from many celebrities including voice actor Yuki Kaji and film director Shunji Iwai, among others. Finally, twelve novels were selected from the retweets to represent the themes for the twelve months. The lineup expanded from classics to more recent pieces. The calendar shot by the renowned photographer and film director Mika Ninagawa was a new attempt to play different roles for twelve works in the calendar. As Yonosuke in Ihara Saikaku's The Life of an Amorous Man for August, props such as smoke tubes are used in a colorful set to express the sex appeal of adults that has never been seen before by him, and the novel published in May cover, No Longer Human (as Ōba Yōzō), the darkness of human beings and the beauty of men are produced. Of the twelve novels so far, "Mysterious Weather at Yanaka's Retro Camera Store" (as Imamiya Ryūichi) and Hamlet (as Ophelia), including the prior mentioned works have been confirmed. For this project, Ryu challenged silver hair for the first time, shooting taking two days to complete. The calendar was sold on December 25, 2020, to signify the 25 year anniversary.

Kamiki was invited to be the photographer for Takeru Satoh's 2021 Calendar. The concept of a "photobook-like calendar" featured natural expressions when spending time with friends—with a sense of distance that can be taken by an old friend. It is a special calendar taken in places where Satoh wants to go with Kamiki and where he would like to take pictures of him such as driving the car, in Shibuya and Harajuku, in maid cafes, etc. He took over eight thousand photos. Some are excluded in the desk calendar. He wants to have a photo exhibition and albums.

In 2022, Kamiki excavated one of the world's oldest ichthyosaur fossils in Minamisanriku in his first fossil excavation during the filming of "From Miyagi". The fossil is on display at the Minasan Museum.

Artistry and public image 

In the award-winning The Great Yokai War he overcame his fear of swimming. For his role in Kokoro no Ito, he learned sign language and the piano. In 2022, he was voted the Most Powerful Actor in Japan.

Filmography

Films

Live-action

Animation

Television

Live-action

Other Works

Books

Magazine Serialization

Direction

Photography

Documentary

Narration

Radio

Program

Drama

Web drama

Ear Drama

Music Video Appearances

Drama CD

Game

Discography

References

External links

  

 
 Kamiki Ryunosuke on Japanese Film Database
 Ryunosuke Kamiki on Japan Program Catalog
 

1993 births
Living people
Amuse Inc. talents
Best Actor Seiyu Award winners
Horikoshi High School alumni
Japanese male child actors
Japanese male film actors
Japanese male stage actors
Japanese male television actors
Japanese male voice actors
Male voice actors from Saitama Prefecture
Seiyu Award winners
Japanese YouTubers
Asadora lead actors
20th-century Japanese male actors
21st-century Japanese male actors